Piero Gobetti (19 June  1901, Turin – 15 February 1926, Neuilly-sur-Seine) was an Italian journalist, intellectual and radical liberal and anti-fascist. He was an exceptionally active campaigner and critic in the crisis years in Italy after the First World War and into the early years of Fascist rule.

Biography 

A student of law at the University of Turin, he set up his own review Energie Nove (New Energies) in 1918. There he promoted the cause of radical cultural and political renewal, aligning himself with the many critics of liberal parliamentary politics. Drawing upon the idealist philosophy of Benedetto Croce, Gobetti identified cultural change with a spiritual transformation that would unite public and private life. He also attached himself to causes such as educational reform and votes for women led by the independent deputy, Gaetano Salvemini.

In 1920, Gobetti was influenced by Antonio Gramsci, fellow ex-student and Communist editor of the L'Ordine Nuovo ("The New Order"). Gramsci was the leading intellectual during the proletarian unrest in Turin in 1919–1920 which led to the factory occupations in September 1920. Inspired by the workers' movement and Gramsci's argument that they constituted a new revolutionary subject, Gobetti gave up editing Energie Nove in order to rethink his commitments.

In 1922, he began publishing a new review, La Rivoluzione Liberale (Liberal Revolution). Here he expounded a distinctive version of liberalism, conceived as a philosophy of liberation rather than a party doctrine. Deeply moved by the Russian Revolution, which he understood as a liberal event, Gobetti conceived the working class as the leading subject of a liberal revolution. In seeking to take over the factories and govern themselves, he argued, the workers expressed a desire for autonomy and collective freedom that could renew Italy. Liberals, Gobetti argued, should understand the term 'liberal' as adaptable to different classes and institutional arrangements other than the bourgeoisie and parliamentary democracy.

Resistance leader Ada Gobetti was his wife and contributed to La Rivoluzione Liberale as well as other magazines.

Gobetti was highly attentive to the dangers of Benito Mussolini's Fascist Party, which entered government in October, 1922. Whilst conservative liberals hoped to make temporary use of Mussolini's popularity in order to restore parliament, Gobetti recognised the tyrannical orientation of fascism. He claimed fascism represented the 'autobiography of the nation', an accretion of all the ills of Italian society. In particular, fascism continued a political tradition of compromise, absorbing political opponents rather than allowing conflict to express itself openly. Liberalism, he argued, was anti-fascist insofar as, on his account, it recognised that liberty was achieved through struggle and conflict.

In December 1924, Gobetti also began to edit a journal of European literary culture entitled Il Baretti. He used the journal to put into practice his idea of liberal anti-fascism and his conviction that the Italian people could learn to reject the insular nature of fascist culture by means of an education in European culture.

Death and legacy
For his rigid opposition to Fascism, Gobetti's review was closed down and he himself was assaulted by fascist thugs. He was beaten up in 1925 and escaped to Paris early the next year. He died at age 24 in Neuilly-sur-Seine of a heart attack in February 1926 perhaps brought on by the injuries he had received after the severe beating by Fascist squadristi. He is buried in Père Lachaise Cemetery.

Following his death and despite his relatively few writings, Gobetti became a symbol of liberal anti-fascism, inspiring intellectuals such as Carlo Levi and Norberto Bobbio.

In Florestano Vancini's film The Assassination of Matteotti (1973), Gobetti is played by Stefano Oppedisano.

References

 
 
 Ward, David (2010). Piero Gobetti's New World:  Antifascism, Liberalism, Writing. Toronto: University of Toronto Press.

External links
  Centro studi Piero Gobetti
 

20th-century Italian journalists
1901 births
1926 deaths
Politicians from Turin
Journalists from Turin
Italian male journalists
Italian social liberals
Liberal socialism
University of Turin alumni
Burials at Père Lachaise Cemetery
Italian anti-fascists
Exiled Italian politicians